This is a list of notable people from Fredericton, New Brunswick, Canada. Although not everyone in this list was born in Fredericton, they all live or have lived there,  and have had significant connections to the community.

See also
 List of people from New Brunswick

References

 
Fredericton
Fredericton